The Nidḥe Israel Synagogue ( Bet Knesset Nide Yisrael, lit. Synagogue of the Scattered of Israel) is the only synagogue in Bridgetown, Barbados. Located along Synagogue Lane; and bordered by the wider Magazine Lane; James, Coleridge and Pinfold streets; it is a part of the Synagogue Historic District.  In 2011 the synagogue and excavated mikveh were designated as UNESCO protected properties within the World Heritage Site of Historic Bridgetown and its Garrison area.  It is one of the oldest synagogues in the Western hemisphere and a Barbados National Trust property.

History 

Built in 1654, it was destroyed by a hurricane in 1831, was rebuilt, but then fell into disrepair until it was sold in 1929.

Haim Isaac Carigal was in Barbados, perhaps acting as rabbi of the congregation, at the time of his death in 1777.

About 300 Jews from Recife, Brazil, persecuted by the Portuguese, settled in Barbados in the 1660s. Skilled in the sugar industry, they quickly introduced the sugarcane crop and passed on their skills in cultivation and production to the Barbados land owners.

Present day 
From the time that the synagogue was deconsecrated in 1929, it underwent numerous changes. The women's gallery that looked down on the ark and bimah was converted into a full second floor. Arches around the windows and the original floor were replaced. The building changed ownership many times as well and the Jewish cemetery outside became a dumping site.

In 1983, the building was seized by the Barbados Government, which intended to raze the building and erect a courthouse. Two years later, it turned the building over to the Barbados National Trust, in thanks to petitioning by the local Jewish community. In 1986, the renovation process began led by Sir Paul Altman. The building was returned to use as a synagogue when the renovation was complete, though it is still owned by the National Trust.

In 2008, an American archaeologist, Michael Stoner, was excavating the former rabbi's house on the premises. As he was digging, two Israeli tourists happened by and uttered the word mikveh. After excavating for three weeks, Stoner had indeed discovered a mikveh, probably dating to the 17th century.

The Nidhe Israel Museum was also opened in 2008.

See also
History of the Jews in Barbados
Dutch Brazil
History of the Jews in Latin America
List of historic buildings in Bridgetown and Saint Ann's Garrison

Footnotes

References

External links
Oldest known Jewish settlement in Barbados Nidhe Israel Synagogue and Museum in Barbados.
Archaeologist in Mikvah Excavation, The Jewish Synagogue, The Ministry of Community Development & Culture, Barbados.
Video of the grounds of the Jewish Synagogue /w interviews.

Buildings and structures in Bridgetown
Sephardi Conservative Judaism
Sephardi Jewish culture in the Caribbean
Sephardi synagogues
Synagogues in Barbados
Conservative Judaism in North America
Conservative synagogues
17th-century synagogues
Religious organizations established in the 1650s
World Heritage Sites in Barbados
Museums in Barbados
1654 establishments in the British Empire